Marana Regional Airport , also known as Marana Northwest Regional Airport or Avra Valley Airport, is a non-towered, general aviation airport about 15 miles (13 nmi; 24 km) northwest of Tucson, Arizona in Marana a town in Pima County, Arizona, United States. In 1999, the airport was purchased from Pima County by the town of Marana.

According to the FAA's National Plan of Integrated Airport Systems for 2007–2011, it is categorized as a relief airport. It is not served by any commercial airlines at this time.

Although most U.S. airports use the same three-letter location identifier for the FAA and IATA, Marana Regional Airport is assigned AVQ by the FAA and AVW by the IATA.

Facilities 
AVQ has two asphalt paved runways:
 12/30 measuring 
 3/21 measuring 

For the 12-month period ending April 19, 2017, the airport had 90,252 aircraft operations, an average of 248 per day: 67% general aviation, 11% air taxi, and 22% military. At that time there were 245 aircraft based at this airport: 88% single-engine, 2% ultralight, 6% multi-engine, 3% jet, 0.5% glider and 0.5% helicopter.

History

In 1943 then Marana Auxiliary Army Airfield No. 2 (a.k.a. Rillito Field) was one of five auxiliary fields that served Marana Army Air Field (now Pinal Airpark) and is part of many Arizona World War II Army Airfields. The United States Army Air Forces trained at Marana through World War II and the Korean War in North American T-6 Texan and North American T-28 Trojan aircraft.

The military sold the airport to a private operator. It was renamed Avra Valley Airport, and in 1968 expanded the runway by 1200 feet. By 1972 there were more than 30 civilian aircraft based at the airport. In 1973 Pima County Department of Transportation bought the airport and expanded the runways even more. Further improvements into 1980s included adding a parking lot, terminal building, and offices. Skyrider Cafe opened in 1983.

In 1999 the Town of Marana bought the airport for Pima County and changed the name to Marana Northwest Regional Airport, then in 2002 renamed it to Marana Regional Airport.

A timeline for the improvements has not been specified.

See also
 Pinal Airpark
 Arizona World War II Army Airfields
 List of airports in Arizona

References

External links 
 Marana Regional Airport at Town of Marana website
 Marana Northwest Regional Airport (AVQ) at Arizona DOT airport directory
  
 Listen to Live CTAF at Marana Regional Airport on LiveATC.net
 
 
 Flight training at Marana Regional Airport
 Marana Flight School
 Volare Helicopters
 Sky Dive Marana

Airports in Pima County, Arizona
Aviation in Arizona